Marcin Garuch (born 14 September 1988) is a Polish professional footballer who plays as a midfielder for Miedź Legnica II. Garuch is known to be the shortest professional footballer in Europe.

Career
Garuch started his senior career with Miedź Legnica. In 2012, he was loaned to Chojniczanka Chojnice.

Honours
Miedź Legnica
I liga: 2021–22

References

External links 
 Marcin Garuch, our man in Montenegro
 Montenegro - Poland. Marcin Garuch about the game in the Montenegrin league
 A Pole from the Montenegrin league: "They believe they have a good team here. It will be hot!"
 GARUCH: How did I become a stranger from nowhere?!
 Marcin Garuch: "The boys don't realize that a moment on the pitch can change their lives" (INTERVIEW)
 Marcin Garuch: You have to remember history, but you shouldn't live it

1988 births
Living people
Polish footballers
Polish expatriate footballers
Expatriate footballers in Montenegro
Association football midfielders
Miedź Legnica players
Chojniczanka Chojnice players
OFK Grbalj players
GKS Bełchatów players
I liga players
II liga players
III liga players
People from Legnica